Missy Ryan is an American journalist. She covers the Pentagon, military issues and national security at The Washington Post. She previously wrote for Reuters.

Education 
Ryan received a B.A. in English Literature from Georgetown University in 1997. She then completed a master's degree at the Harvard Kennedy School in 2005.

Career 
Ryan started as a Correspondent covering Iraq in 2008 for Reuters News Agency. She was made Deputy Bureau Chief in Baghdad in 2010. Ryan was then posted to Mexico for four months as the Acting Bureau Chief before returning to Washington to serve as Pentagon Correspondent.

In 2012, Ryan became a White House fellow and won the New York Press Club award for political reporting in 2012. She became National Security and US-Middle East Correspondent in 2013. Ryan joined The Washington Post in 2014 as a Staff Writer, covering the Pentagon.

References

External links

Missy Ryan on Twitter
Missy Ryan on LinkedIn

Year of birth missing (living people)
Living people
Georgetown University alumni
Harvard Kennedy School alumni
21st-century American journalists
American women journalists
The Washington Post people
American women war correspondents
Reuters people
21st-century American women